The Hunter 27 is a series of American sailboats, that were first built in 1974.

Production
The boat was built by Hunter Marine in the United States, but it is now out of production.

Design
The Hunter 27 series are all small recreational keelboats, built predominantly of fiberglass.

Variants

Hunter 27
This model was designed by John Cherubini, introduced in 1974 and produced until 1984, with 2,000 examples completed. The full keel model has a PHRF racing average handicap of 189 with a high of 189 and low of 192. The shoal draft model has a PHRF racing average handicap of 225 with a high of 237 and low of 220. A tall mast version was also built, with a mast about  higher. The tall mast model has a PHRF racing average handicap of 213 with a high of 222 and low of 208. With the tall mast and the shoal draft keel, the boat has a PHRF racing average handicap of 222 with a high of 219 and low of 226.
Hunter 27-2

This model was designed by the Hunter Design Team and introduced in 1989 and produced until 1994. The boat is fitted with a Japanese Yanmar 1GM-10 diesel engine or an outboard motor. The boat has a PHRF racing average handicap of 192 with a high of 186 and low of 201.
Hunter 27-3

This new model was designed by Glenn Henderson and introduced in 2006. A twin bilge keel model was also sold in the UK.
Hunter 27X

This model is a high-performance racing version of the Hunter 27-3, that was also designed by Glenn Henderson and introduced in 2006.
Hunter 27 Edge

See also
List of sailing boat types

Similar sailboats
Aloha 27
C&C 27
Cal 27
Cal 2-27
Cal 3-27
Catalina 27
Catalina 270
Catalina 275 Sport
Crown 28
CS 27
Edel 820
Express 27
Fantasia 27
Halman Horizon
Hotfoot 27
Hullmaster 27
Irwin 27 
Island Packet 27
Mirage 27 (Perry)
Mirage 27 (Schmidt)
Mirage 275
O'Day 272
Orion 27-2
Tanzer 27
Watkins 27
Watkins 27P

References

External links

Keelboats
1970s sailboat type designs
Sailing yachts
Sailboat type designs by John Cherubini
Sailboat types built by Hunter Marine